The 2008–09 season was Cardiff City's sixth consecutive year playing in the Football League Championship and their 82nd season playing in The Football League. It was also the club's final season playing at Ninian Park, their home ground since they had entered The Football League in 1920.

Season review

Events
 9 September 2008 – Peter Ridsdale and the board of directors attend a "Topping Off" ceremony at the club's new stadium.
 26 August 2008 – Ninian Park hold its last League Cup match in a 2–1 win against Milton Keynes Dons.
 6 November 2009 – Dave Jones receives October manager of the month.
 25 January 2009 – Ninian Park hold its last FA Cup match in a 0–0 draw against Arsenal.
 25 April 2009 – Ninian Park holds its last league game, a 3–0 loss against Ipswich Town.

Pre-season

Cardiff began their pre-season schedule with matches against Welsh sides Merthyr Tydfil and Carmarthen Town, with squads made up of first team players and youth players. Goals from Steve Thompson, Jon Brown and youth player Sol Taylor saw a 3–1 win over Merthyr and a hat-trick from Paul Parry along with one from Rhys Kelleher and an own goal saw the other match end in a 5–0 win for Cardiff. Several days later, Cardiff flew out to Portugal to take part in the Algarve Cup, along with Middlesbrough, Celtic and Vitória de Guimarães. Before the tournament they played a warm-up match against Portuguese side Vitoria de Setubal which ended in a 1–1 draw.

Their Algarve Cup tournament began with a match against Vitória de Guimarães, coming away with a 2–0 win with both goals being scored by summer signing Ross McCormack. In the second and final game of the tournament they overcame Scottish Premier League champions Celtic 1–0 with Joe Ledley scoring the only goal as Cardiff came away as the tournament winners. Returning to Britain, they played out a 1–1 draw with Swindon Town followed by a 0–0 draw with Dutch side Ajax in their first home pre-season tie. They finished their pre-season schedule with a friendly against Chasetown with a team made up of senior and youth players. The match finished 2–2 with goals from Paul Parry and trialist Wilson Oruma.

League

Cardiff opened their season with a home tie against Southampton, the first time they had been handed a home tie on the opening day of the season for eleven years, and went on to win 2–1 after a last minute winner by Roger Johnson. Propelled by the goals of summer signing Ross McCormack, Cardiff did not suffer a defeat until their ninth league game of the season when they lost 2–1 to Birmingham City, but they bounced back quickly with a 2–1 win over Coventry City three days later and the sides form through October, three wins and two draws, saw manager Dave Jones awarded the manager of the month award.

A slump in form saw three defeats in the next four games but despite the loss of form the side remained in the play-off zone. During the poor spell, former player Michael Chopra returned on loan just over a year after leaving the club in a club record £5m sale to Sunderland, converting a penalty on his debut in a 2–1 win over Crytsal Palace on 15 November. On 22 November, the second South Wales derby of the season took place, after an earlier meeting in the League Cup, with the match ending in a 2–2 draw with both sides being reduced to ten men due to red cards for Stephen McPhail and Darren Pratley. The match was the second of what would become a three-month unbeaten spell which took the side through to the end of February without defeat until they lost 1–0 to Southampton, a run which saw Cardiff rise to 4th place in the table.

The following game saw Cardiff win 3–1 against Barnsley, the first time in the season they had scored more than two goals in a single game. They went on to win 3 of their 6 matches in March before meeting local rivals Swansea City for the third time during the season on 5 April. The match ended in a 2–2 draw but was overshadowed by referee Mike Dean being struck by a coin thrown from the crowd. The incident was condemned by chairman Peter Ridsdale and manager Dave Jones after the match. Three consecutive wins for the side meant that with 4 games remaining they needed two points to secure a play-off place but they only managed one point during the final four games, in a 2–2 draw with Charlton Athletic, which would lead to them finishing in seventh place, missing out on a play-off spot to Preston North End on goals scored.

Final league standings

Player presentations
As part of the celebrations of the club's final year at Ninian Park former players and staff of the club were presented to the crowd at half-time during various home matches throughout the season. At the end of the season all the players were invited back for the final game at the ground against Ipswich Town. The date, opponent and people presented were:
 9 August 2008 – Southampton – Colin Baker and Alan Harrington
 23 August 2008 – Norwich City – Don Murray and Bobby Woodruff
 18 October 2008 – Charlton Athletic – Phil Dwyer and Richie Morgan
 1 November 2008 – Wolverhampton Wanderers – Jeff Hemmerman and Chris Pike
 15 November 2008 – Crystal Palace – Eddie May and Keith Pontin
 20 December 2008 – Sheffield Wednesday – Carl Dale
 5 April 2009 – Swansea City – John Williams
 13 April 2009 – Burnley – David Carver and Derek Showers

League Cup

Cardiff began their League cup campaign away to League Two side Bournemouth, coming away with a 2–1 win with both goals scored by Paul Parry in the opening twelve minutes of the match. After coming through the second round with a 2–1 home win over Milton Keynes Dons, Cardiff were handed a third round tie against local rivals Swansea City in the first South Wales derby to take place in nine years. A heated encounter saw Swansea come away with a 1–0 after a deflected free-kick, with Cardiff being reduced to ten men after Stephen McPhail saw red for two bookable offences. After the match fans from both clubs clashed with police.

FA Cup

Entering the competition in the third round, Cardiff's first match in the FA Cup came up against fellow Championship side Reading, with goals from Ross McCormack and Joe Ledley putting Cardiff through to the next round with a 2–0 win. In the fourth round Cardiff were handed a lucrative home tie against Premier League side Arsenal. The match, taking place in a packed Ninian Park, finished in a 0–0 draw. The replay, which was originally set to be played on 3 February but was postponed due to heavy snowfall, took place on 16 February, ending in a 4–0 win for Arsenal.

Kits

|
|
|
|
|

Squad at end of season

Detailed Overview

Squad statistics

|}
 * Indicates player left club during the season.

Disciplinary record

Contracts

Transfers

In

Loans in

Outs

Loans Out

Fixtures & results

Results by round

Pre-season friendlies

Championship

League Cup

FA Cup

Overall summary

League Score Overview

Backroom staff
 Manager: Dave Jones
 Assistant manager: Terry Burton
 Reserve team manager: Paul Wilkinson
 Club doctor: Dr Leonard Noakes
 Club physio: Sean Connelly
 Fitness coach: Alex Armstrong
 Goalkeeping coach: Martyn Margetson
 Kit manager: Ian Lanning
 Performance analyst: Enda Barron
 Masseur: Steffan Burnett
 Academy manager: Neal Ardley

Awards

Team
 Algarve Cup – Winners
 Welsh team of the year: Winners

Individual
 October Championship manager of the month: Dave Jones.
 Welsh Clubman of the Year: Joe Ledley
 January Championship player of the month: Joe Ledley

See also

Cardiff City F.C. seasons

References

Cardiff City F.C. seasons
Cardiff City
Cardiff